School District of Clayton includes all of Clayton, portions of Richmond Heights, and a portion of unincorporated St. Louis County, Missouri, US. The district is located immediately to the west of the City of St. Louis. Some areas have St. Louis postal addresses, though they are not in the city limits. As of 2017 the school district had 2,681 students, 278 staff, and 6 schools. There was an 11:1 student-teacher ratio.

The district was ranked fourth best in the United States by Niche in 2018. The District, Clayton High School, Wydown Middle School, and Captain Elementary School also were ranked first in Missouri in their respective “best schools” rankings. Glenridge Elementary took the second spot in the Missouri ranking, followed closely by Meramec Elementary at number four. The District also was ranked first in the State of Missouri, and 16th in the country in the ranking of the best places to teach.

Schools

High school

 Clayton High School — grades 9-12. Clayton High School is highly rated academically.  It was ranked by Newsweek as the 230th-best public high school in the nation in 2004, which was the 2nd highest in the state of Missouri. In 2011 it was ranked as the 89th best public high school in the nation and was 1st in the state of Missouri. , Clayton High School is rated number 2 best public school in Missouri by Niche. As of 2007, approximately 97% of all Clayton High Schoolers graduate High School, and go on to college. The school won the 2004 Missouri Class 4 state championship in football.  The high school's mascot is the Greyhound, and its colors are orange and blue.

Middle school

 Wydown Middle School supports students in grades 6-8. The school was erected in 1942. It has since been demolished and replaced with a LEED certified, state of the art building, still holding grades 6-8. At this point, Wydown was being used as a junior high school. This school has a reputation for its intramural programs and its mathematics. It has been ranked top ten in Missouri for "excellence in mathematics for schools with over 500 students" since 1999.

Elementary schools

 Ralph M. Captain Elementary School — grades K-5
 Glenridge Elementary School — grades K-5
 Meramec Elementary School — grades K-5

Early childhood education and parenting

 The Family Center — pre-K

References

External links
 School District of Clayton
 

School districts in Missouri
Education in St. Louis County, Missouri